François-Marie, Marquess of Barthélemy (20 October 1747, Aubagne3 April 1830 Paris) was a French politician and diplomat, active at the time of the French Revolution.

Biography

Diplomat and member of the Directory
Born in Aubagne, he was educated by his uncle the abbé Jean-Jacques Barthélemy for a diplomatic career. After serving as secretary of legation in Sweden, in Switzerland and in the Kingdom of Great Britain, he was appointed Minister Plenipotentiary in Switzerland, in which capacity he negotiated the treaties of Basel with Prussia and Spain (1795).

Elected a member of the Directory in May 1797, through Royalist influence, he was arrested after General Augereau's anti-Royalist coup d'état of the 18 Fructidor (17 September 1797), and deported to French Guiana, but escaped and made his way to Suriname, then to the United States, and finally to Britain.

Empire
Barthélemy returned to France after Napoleon Bonaparte's 18 Brumaire coup, entered the Senate in February 1800 and contributed to the establishment of the Consulship for life and the First French Empire.

In 1814 he abandoned Napoleon, voted the Acte de déchéance de l'Empereur and took part in the drawing up of King Louis XVIII's Constitutional Charter and was named Peer of France. During the Hundred Days he lived in concealment, and after the Second Restoration obtained the title marquis, and in 1819 introduced a motion in the chamber of Peers tending to render the electoral law more aristocratic.

Legacy
The Rue François Barthélémy in Héricy is named after him.

References

1747 births
1830 deaths
People from Aubagne
Directeurs of the First French Republic
People of the First French Empire
18th-century French diplomats
Ambassadors of France to Great Britain
Members of the Sénat conservateur
French marquesses
Peers of France
Burials at Père Lachaise Cemetery